Clear Creek is an unincorporated community in Raleigh County, West Virginia, United States. Clear Creek has a post office with ZIP code 25044.

In December 2018, four people seeking to gather copper became trapped for five days in an abandoned mine near Clear Creek, the Rock House Powellton coal mine.

References

Unincorporated communities in Raleigh County, West Virginia
Unincorporated communities in West Virginia